Sweethearts of Rhythm is a 2009 book by Marilyn Nelson and illustrated by Jerry Pinkney, published by Dial Books for Young Readers. It is about various musical instruments in a pawnshop poetically reminiscing about the jazz band, International Sweethearts of Rhythm.

Reception
The Horn Book Magazine, in a review of Sweethearts of Rhythm, wrote "Nelson's verbal evocations of the music and its players, and her wry asides .. re-create a wartime when the absence of men enabled these talented women to pursue their art. Pinkney does them proud in expansive wordless spreads between the poems plus full-page art facing each poem;".

Booklist''', in a starred review, found "Words and pictures swinging together capture the Sweethearts in full cry." and School Library Journal wrote "Nelson's syncopated poetry jives perfectly with Pinkney's layered watercolors".Sweethearts of Rhythm has also been reviewed by Publishers Weekly, Library Media Connection magazine, Voice of Youth Advocates, and Kirkus Reviews''.

Awards
2009 Publishers Weekly Best Children's Books
2010 ALA Notable Children's Book
2010 Notable Social Studies Trade Books For Young People - History/Life & Culture in the America
2010 Notable Book for a Global Society: Poetry
2010 YALSA Excellence in Nonfiction for Young Adults Award - nominated
2014 National Endowment for the Humanities Nonfiction Booklist for Young Readers: 9-13

References

2009 children's books
2009 poetry books
American picture books
Children's poetry books
Picture books by Jerry Pinkney
American poetry collections
Dial Press books
Books about musicians